Asca bicornis is a species of mite in the family Ascidae. It is found in Europe.

References

Further reading

 

bicornis
Articles created by Qbugbot
Animals described in 1887